Jacques Di Donato (born 27 August 1942) is a French musician and improviser. A clarinetist, saxophonist and drummer, he works in various fields ranging from jazz to contemporary music, classical music and improvised music. He was a clarinet teacher at the Conservatoire national supérieur de musique et de danse de Lyon between 1984 and 2007.

Biography 
Born in Bourg-en-Bresse, Di Donato discovered music at the age of twelve, when he began playing in his father's ball orchestra. He later discovered the saxophone, then the clarinet, which became his instrument of choice.

He studied at the Conservatoire de Paris where he obtained his first prizes in clarinet and chamber music.

He has made numerous collaborations with artists such as Louis Sclavis, Pierre Boulez, Bernard Lubat, among many others.

He appeared as soloist in various orchestras, notably with the Orchestre philharmonique de Radio France from 1978 to 1990.

Leader of several ensembles (including "Trio de clarinettes", Jacques Di Donato Quintet, the "Mhère Quartet", the "Système Friche", and "Brahmâ"), he created and directed the festival "Fruits de Mhère, Les Champs de l'Improvisation", dedicated to avant-garde music and experimental arts in general. He was a member of the Saxophone quartet, with Jean-Louis Chautemps.

In 1998, he designed the B♭ clarinet model and the Signature for the Henri Selmer Paris instrument maker.

Awards   
Di Donato was made a Chevalier of the Ordre des Arts et des Lettres in 1985.

Albums 
 1982: Mad Sax II, "Quatuor de saxophones", CY Records – 733613 WE 341
 1991: Trio de clarinettes Live, Jacques Di Donato, Louis Sclavis, Armand Angster, FMP
 1993: Clic!!!, Jacques Di Donato Quintet, Pan Music
 1993: Green dolphy suite, Double trio, Enja Records
 1995: Déblocage d'émergence,  quartet, AA Records
 1996: Le Système Friche, Xavier Charles, Jacques Di Donato, In Situ
 1996: Du Slavon Glagol, Khokhot
 1999: La Compagnie des Musiques à Ouïr, la Lichère- Frémeaux associés
 2007: Les p’tites chansons de Marc Perrone, Rue Bleue Productions
 2010: Images et Personnages, Gael Mevel quintet, Leo Records  
 2011: Brahmâ, Brahmâ Trio  
 2012: Resurgence, Michel Edelin quartet, RogueArt

References

External links 
 Official website
 Interview de Jacques Di Donato par Jacme Gaudàs pour JazzHot, 1998
 Biography of Jacques Di Donato on Henri Selmer website- Paris
 Via Nova Quartet- Jacques Di Donato clarinet (YouTube)

French experimental musicians
Free improvisation clarinetists
Free improvisation saxophonists
20th-century French composers
French jazz saxophonists
Male saxophonists
French jazz clarinetists
French classical clarinetists
French jazz drummers
Male drummers
1942 births
Living people
People from Bourg-en-Bresse
Conservatoire de Paris alumni
Academic staff of the Conservatoire de Paris
Chevaliers of the Ordre des Arts et des Lettres
21st-century saxophonists
21st-century clarinetists
20th-century French male musicians
21st-century French male musicians
French male jazz musicians
RogueArt artists